The white-shouldered antbird (Akletos melanoceps) is a species of bird in the family Thamnophilidae. It is found in Brazil, Colombia, Ecuador, and Peru. Its natural habitat is subtropical or tropical swamps.

The white-shouldered antbird was described and illustrated by the German naturalist Johann Baptist von Spix in 1825 and given the binomial name Thamnophilus melanoceps. It was subsequently moved to the genus Myrmeciza. A molecular phylogenetic study published in 2013 found that Myrmeciza was polyphyletic. In the resulting rearrangement to create monophyletic genera this species was moved to the resurrected genus Akletos which had been introduced by the Polish ornithologist Andrzej Dunajewski in 1948.

References

External links
Xeno-canto: audio recordings of the White-shouldered Antbird

white-shouldered antbird
Birds of the Colombian Amazon
Birds of the Ecuadorian Amazon
white-shouldered antbird
Taxonomy articles created by Polbot
Taxobox binomials not recognized by IUCN